The Scarborough Shooting Stars are a Canadian professional basketball team based in Scarborough, Toronto, Ontario, Canada. They compete in the Canadian Elite Basketball League (CEBL) and play their home games at the Toronto Pan Am Sports Centre in Scarborough. Founded in 2021, the Shooting Stars are the first professional sports team to be based in Scarborough.

History 
The Scarborough Shooting Stars were established on August 16, 2021, owned by Nicholas “Niko” Carino (co-founder of record label OVO Sound) & Sam Ibrahim (founding member of venture capital firm Playground Global). They are the eighth franchise of the league and made their debut in the 2022 CEBL season. They were the first franchise from the Greater Toronto Area. Scarborough native Chris Exilus became the first head coach of the team. In May, the Shooting Stars gained worldwide attention when rapper Jermaine Cole (known under his artist name J.Cole) signed with the team. Other notable players in the Shooting Stars' debut season included Jalen Harris and Xavier Rathan-Mayes.

In the Shooting Stars' first season, they reached the CEBL Finals after beating Saskatchewan in the quarter-finals and Niagara in the semi-finals. In the finals, the Hamilton Honey Badgers narrowly defeated them, 90–88. After the season, Isaiah Mike and Jalen Harris were named to the 2022 All-CEBL First Team.

Arena 
The Shooting Stars play their games at the Toronto Pan Am Sports Centre. It is located at the University of Toronto Scarborough campus.

Players

Current roster

Season-by-season record

References

External links 
 Official website

Canadian Elite Basketball League teams
Basketball teams established in 2021
2021 establishments in Ontario
Basketball teams in Toronto
Scarborough, Toronto